Marckwald is a surname. Notable people with the surname include:

 Dorothy Marckwald (1898–1986), American interior designer
 Wilhelm Marckwald, German actor and director
 Willy Marckwald (1864–1942), German chemist